Gordionus is a genus of Nematomorpha belonging to the family Chordodidae.

The species of this genus are found in Europe, Japan, Australia and Northern America.

Species:
 Gordionus alascensis (Montgomery, 1907) 
 Gordionus alpestris (Villot, 1884)

References

Nematomorpha